The Customs Convention on the Temporary Importation for Private Use of Aircraft and Pleasure Boats is a 1956 United Nations multilateral treaty. In states that adhere to the Convention, it allows individuals that are temporarily visiting a country—such as tourists—to import an aircraft or pleasure boat to the country duty free so long as the aircraft or boat will be used exclusively for private use.

The Convention was patterned after the Customs Convention on the Temporary Importation of Private Road Vehicles and was concluded in Geneva on 18 May 1956, the same day the Customs Convention on Containers and the Customs Convention on the Temporary Importation of Commercial Road Vehicles was concluded.

The Convention entered into force on 1 January 1959. It was signed by 11 states and as of 2013 has 26 state parties.

The Convention was somewhat superseded in 1990 by the Istanbul Convention, which combines in one single instrument the various conventions on the temporary admission of specific goods.

See also
ATA Carnet

External links
Text
Ratifications

1956 in Switzerland
1956 in transport
Treaties concluded in 1956
Treaties entered into force in 1959
Customs treaties
Transport treaties
Tourism treaties
United Nations treaties
Treaties of Algeria
Treaties of Austria
Treaties of Belgium
Treaties of Croatia
Treaties of Denmark
Treaties of Finland
Treaties of France
Treaties of West Germany
Treaties of the Hungarian People's Republic
Treaties of Italy
Treaties of Jamaica
Treaties of Luxembourg
Treaties of Malta
Treaties of Mauritius
Treaties of Montenegro
Treaties of the Netherlands
Treaties of the Estado Novo (Portugal)
Treaties of Serbia and Montenegro
Treaties of Sierra Leone
Treaties of Slovenia
Treaties of the Solomon Islands
Treaties of Francoist Spain
Treaties of Sweden
Treaties of Switzerland
Treaties of Trinidad and Tobago
Treaties of the United Kingdom
Treaties of Yugoslavia
Treaties extended to the Netherlands Antilles
Treaties extended to Aruba
Treaties extended to Surinam (Dutch colony)
Treaties extended to Netherlands New Guinea
Treaties extended to the Faroe Islands
Treaties extended to Greenland
Treaties extended to West Berlin
Treaties extended to Liechtenstein
Treaties extended to Saint Pierre and Miquelon
Treaties extended to French Somaliland
Treaties extended to French Comoros
Treaties extended to New Caledonia
Treaties extended to French Polynesia
Treaties extended to the New Hebrides
Treaties extended to Guernsey
Treaties extended to the Isle of Man
Treaties extended to Jersey
Treaties extended to the Colony of Aden
Treaties extended to the Aden Protectorate
Treaties extended to British Guiana
Treaties extended to Brunei (protectorate)
Treaties extended to the Gambia Colony and Protectorate
Treaties extended to Gibraltar
Treaties extended to British Kenya
Treaties extended to the West Indies Federation
Treaties extended to the Colony of North Borneo
Treaties extended to Saint Helena, Ascension and Tristan da Cunha
Treaties extended to the Colony of Sarawak
Treaties extended to the Crown Colony of Seychelles
Treaties extended to the Crown Colony of Singapore
Treaties extended to British Somaliland
Treaties extended to Tanganyika (territory)
Treaties extended to the Uganda Protectorate
Treaties extended to the British Solomon Islands
Treaties extended to the Sultanate of Zanzibar
Treaties extended to British Cyprus
Treaties extended to the Crown Colony of Malta
Treaties extended to the Colony of Sierra Leone
Treaties extended to the Falkland Islands
Treaties extended to British Hong Kong
Treaties extended to British Honduras
Treaties extended to British Mauritius